

Horst Rudat (3 May 1920 − 31 August 1982) was a general in the German Air Force. During World War II, he served in the Luftwaffe of Nazi Germany as a bomber pilot.

In the weeks following Operation Overlord, the Allied invasion of France, Rudat was tasked with the leadership of a task force in 2./Kampfgeschwader 101. The task force was experimenting with the Mistel, a Luftwaffe aircraft bombing system, based broadly on the parasite aircraft concept. Rudat led a formation of 4 Mistel aircraft against the invasion fleet of off Normandy in the night of 24/25 June 1944. , a British , was damaged killing nine of her crew.

Awards
Iron Cross (1939) 2nd Class (9 August 1941) & 1st Class (7 September 1941)
Ehrenpokal der Luftwaffe (27 May 1942)
German Cross in Gold on 27 July 1942 as Oberleutnant in the 3./KG 55
Knight's Cross of the Iron Cross on 24 March 1943 as Oberleutnant and Staffelkapitän of the 2./KG 55

References

Citations

Bibliography

 Ford, Roger (2000). Germany's Secret Weapons in World War II. Zenith Imprint. .
 Forsyth, Robert (2001). Mistel - German Composite Aircraft and Operations 1942-1945. Classic Publications Limited. .
 Kaiser, Jochen (2011). Die Ritterkreuzträger der Kampfflieger—Band 2 (in German and English). Bad Zwischenahn, Germany: Luftfahrtverlag-Start. .
 
 

1920 births
1982 deaths
People from East Prussia
Luftwaffe pilots
Recipients of the Gold German Cross
Recipients of the Knight's Cross of the Iron Cross
Officers Crosses of the Order of Merit of the Federal Republic of Germany
Bundeswehr generals
German Air Force pilots
Major generals of the German Air Force